Andy Tillson (born 30 June 1966) is an English football coach and former player who was head coach at Team Bath. Following Team Bath's decision to disband at the end of the 2008–09 season, Tillson was initially appointed as Weymouth's Assistant Manager, but on 15 June 2009 it was announced that he would instead join Exeter City as First Team Coach under manager Paul Tisdale.

He was signed for Queens Park Rangers by Don Howe in 1990 from Grimsby Town along with Darren Peacock to cover a major injury crisis at Loftus Road and made his debut in the 1–1 draw with Derby County.

He was a central defender and his chances were limited once Alan McDonald, Danny Maddix and Paul Parker returned from injury. He made just 29 appearances for QPR scoring 2 goals before being signed by Bristol Rovers for a club record fee of £370,000 in 1992. He became the club captain of Bristol Rovers and made over 250 league appearances for the club before joining Walsall and then Rushden & Diamonds.

Honours
Walsall
Football League Second Division play-offs: 2001

Individual
PFA Team of the Year: 2000–01 Second Division

References

Andy Tillson from poppiesfans.com. Retrieved 9 November 2006.

1966 births
Living people
People from Huntingdon
English footballers
Association football defenders
English Football League players
Grimsby Town F.C. players
Queens Park Rangers F.C. players
Bristol Rovers F.C. players
Walsall F.C. players
Rushden & Diamonds F.C. players
Exeter City F.C. non-playing staff